General Dutton may refer to:

Arthur Henry Dutton (1838–1864), Union Army posthumously breveted brigadier general
Bryan Dutton (born 1943), British Army major general
Jack Dutton (1928–2011), South African Army lieutenant general
James Dutton (Royal Marines officer) (born 1954), Royal Marines lieutenant general